Massanes, also called Maçanes, is a municipality of the province of Girona, in the comarca of the Selva in Catalonia, Spain. It is situated on the left bank of the Tordera river. Local roads link the town with the A-7 autopista, the C-251 road and the RENFE railway station shared with Maçanet de la Selva.

Demography

References

 Panareda Clopés, Josep Maria; Rios Calvet, Jaume; Rabella Vives, Josep Maria (1989). Guia de Catalunya, Barcelona: Caixa de Catalunya.  (Spanish).  (Catalan).

External links 

Official website 
 Government data pages 

Municipalities in Selva
Populated places in Selva